The University Library of the University of Mumbai is part of the Victorian buildings complex around the Oval Maidan in Mumbai that is a UNESCO World Heritage Site. It was built between 1869 and 1878 along with the Rajabai Clock Tower, and designed by Sir George Gilbert Scott, who incidentally never visited Bombay and worked from London.

The foundation stone for the library was laid on 1 March 1869, and it formally opened for the students and faculty on 27 February 1880.

Gallery

References

External links

George Gilbert Scott - Mumbai University Library

The Victorian and Art Deco Ensemble of Mumbai
1878 establishments in India
Gothic Revival architecture in India
Buildings and structures completed in 1878
Venetian Gothic architecture
Libraries in Mumbai
Libraries established in 1878